Boğazköy is a village in the Sarıyahşi District, Aksaray Province, Turkey. Its population is 674 (2021). Before the 2013 reorganisation, it was a town (belde).

References

Villages in Sarıyahşi District